Akai is the name of:

 Shuichi Akai, a fictional character in the manga series Case Closed
 Shuichi Akai (footballer) (born 1981), Japanese former footballer
 Takami Akai (born 1961), Japanese illustrator, game creator, character designer and animator
 Saki Akai (born 1987), Japanese professional wrestler
 Hideyuki Akai (born 1985), Japanese football player
 Akai Teruko (1514 – 1594), Japanese Onna-musha warrior.
 Akai Terukage (1548 – 1573), Japanese samurai 
 Akai Gurley (c. 1986–2014), African-American man shot and killed by a New York City Police officer
 Akai Osei (born 1999), British actor, dancer and musician, winner of the first series of Got to Dance

Japanese-language surnames